The Price Tower is a nineteen-story, 221-foot-high tower at 510 South Dewey Avenue in Bartlesville, Oklahoma.  It was built in 1956 to a design by Frank Lloyd Wright. It is the only realized skyscraper by Wright, and is one of only two vertically oriented Wright structures extant (the other is the S.C. Johnson Wax Research Tower in Racine, Wisconsin).

The Price Tower was commissioned by Harold C. Price of the H. C. Price Company, a local oil pipeline and chemical firm.  It opened to the public in February 1956.

History
The Price Tower was commissioned by Harold Price, for use as a corporate headquarters for his Bartlesville company. His wife, Kremlin Lou Patteson Price, and his two sons, Harold Jr. and Joe, rounded out the building committee. The Prices were directed to Frank Lloyd Wright by architect Bruce Goff, who was then Dean of Architecture at the University of Oklahoma, where the Price sons had studied. That relationship bonded into a lifelong patronage of both architects by the Price family. Wright designed an Arizona home for the senior Prices and a Bartlesville home known as "Hillside" for Harold Jr., his wife Carolyn Propps Price, and their six children. Goff, who was also a tenant at Price Tower, became the favored architect of Joe Price, designing a bachelor studio on his family's property in Bartlesville and two later additions following his marriage to Etsuko Yoshimochi.

Wright nicknamed the Price Tower, which was built on the Oklahoma prairie, "the tree that escaped the crowded forest," referring not only to the building's construction, but also to the origins of its design. The Price Tower is supported by a central "trunk" of four elevator shafts which are anchored in place by a deep central foundation, as a tree is by its taproot. The nineteen floors of the building are cantilevered from this central core, like the branches of a tree. The outer walls hang from the floors and are clad in patinated copper "leaves." The building is asymmetrical, and like a tree, "looks different from every angle."  Wright had championed these design ideas, which other architects had put to use before the construction of the Price Tower, as early as the 1920s in his design for an apartment complex of four cantilevered towers for St. Marks-in-the-Bowerie in downtown New York City. Following the effects of the Great Depression, the project was shelved and adapted by Wright for the Price Company in 1952. Wright, therefore, plucked his "tree" out of the "crowded forest" of Manhattan skyscrapers and placed it on the Oklahoma prairie where it continues to stand uncrowded by neighboring tall buildings.

The floorplan of the Price Tower centers upon an inlaid cast bronze plaque, bearing the logo of the Price Company and marking the origin of a parallelogram grid upon which all exterior walls, interior partitions and doors, and built-in furniture are placed. The resulting design is a quadrant plan—one quadrant dedicated for double-height apartments, and three for offices. The materials for the Price Tower are equally innovative for a mid-twentieth-century skyscraper: cast concrete walls, pigmented concrete floors, aluminum-trimmed windows and doors, and patinated embossed and distressed copper panels. The general geometric element is the equilateral triangle, and all lighting fixtures and ventilation grilles are based upon that form while the angled walls and built-in furniture are based on fractions or multiples of the triangular module. The lobby contains two inscriptions by Walt Whitman. One is from the concluding stanza of Salut au Monde, and the other from Song of the Broad-Axe. Inside the Price Tower there are decoration paintings on the walls which consist of solid gold. People with claustrophobia may find it uncomfortable, due to the very tight spaces towards the upper floors and the very small elevators. 

Wright designed the St. Mark's project for apartments, but his Price Tower was to be a multi-use building with business offices, shops, and apartments. The H. C. Price Company was the primary tenant, and the remaining office floors and double-height apartments intended as income-raising ventures. Tenants included lawyers, accountants, physicians, dentists, insurance agents, and the architect Bruce Goff, who kept an office in the tower as well as rented one of the apartments. A women's high-end dress shop, beauty salon, and the regional offices of the Public Service Company of Oklahoma occupied a two-story wing of the tower, with a drive-through passageway separating the high and low structures. The Price Company occupied the upper floors, and included a commissary on the sixteenth floor as well as a penthouse office suite for Harold Price Sr., and later his son Harold Jr.

The H.C. Price Company sold Price Tower to Phillips Petroleum in 1981 following a move to Dallas, where their company is presently located. Phillips Petroleum's lawyers deemed the exterior exit staircase a safety risk, and only used the building for storage. They retained ownership until 2000 when the building was donated to Price Tower Arts Center, and it has returned to its multi-use origins. Price Tower Arts Center, a museum of art, architecture, and design; Inn at Price Tower; Copper Restaurant + Bar, and the Wright Place museum store are the current major tenants with smaller firms leasing space. Inn at Price Tower is a member of Historic Hotels of America, the official program of the National Trust for Historic Preservation.

In 2002 Pritzker Prize winning architect, Zaha Hadid, was commissioned to design a museum expansion for Price Tower Arts Center—a project that was included in the 2006 retrospective exhibition of Hadid's work at the Guggenheim Museum, New York City.

On March 29, 2007, the Price Tower was designated a National Historic Landmark by the United States Department of the Interior, then one of only twenty-two such properties in the state of Oklahoma. In 2008, the U.S. National Park Service submitted the Price Tower, along with nine other Frank Lloyd Wright properties, to a tentative list for World Heritage Status. The 10 sites have been submitted as one site. The January 22, 2008, press release from the National Park Service website announcing the nominations states that "The preparation of a Tentative List is a necessary first step in the process of nominating a site to the World Heritage List." However, after a 2016 nomination to the World Heritage List was rejected by the UNESCO World Heritage Committee, a revised 2018 proposal removed the Price Tower from consideration. The revised nomination of eight Frank Lloyd Wright buildings was accepted in July 2019 as The 20th-Century Architecture of Frank Lloyd Wright.

Price Tower Arts Center
The Price Tower Arts Center is the art complex at Price Tower in Bartlesville, Oklahoma.  The center was founded in 1985 as a civic art museum, and reorganized in 1998 to focus on art, architecture and design. Features includes a museum, tours of the historic tower, a hotel and restaurant.

The museum galleries feature changing exhibits.  Collections include modern art, works on paper, furniture, textiles and design. The center owns some significant pieces by Frank Lloyd Wright and renowned Oklahoma architect Bruce Goff.

Visitors can tour temporary exhibitions inside Frank Lloyd Wright's Price Tower, as well as the fully restored 1956 Price Company Executive Office and Corporate Apartment.

Copies
A tribute to the Price Tower called The Classen, designed by the architectural firm Bozalis & Roloff and constructed in 1967, can be found in Oklahoma City's Asian District, along Classen Boulevard, next door to the Buckminster Fuller-inspired Gold Dome, also designed by Bozalis & Roloff.

See also
List of National Historic Landmarks in Oklahoma
National Register of Historic Places listings in Washington County, Oklahoma

References

Bibliography
Articles
 Alexander, John T. "Wright on the Oklahoma Prairie." The Kansas City Times (18 Feb. 1958).
 Alofsin, Anthony. "Broadacre City: The Reception of a Modernist Vision, 1932-1988." Center 5 (1989): 8-43.
 Apostolo, Roberto. "La Price Tower di Frank Lloyd Wright." Frames, Portes, and Finestre (Aug.-Sep. 1992): 54–61.
 "Bartlesville Tower Rises, Oddest Building in State." Tulsa World  (21 Feb. 1955).
 Curtis, Wayne, "Little Skyscraper on the Prairie", The Atlantic (July/August 2008).
 Cuscaden, R.R.  "Frank Lloyd Wright's Drawings, Preserved." Prairie School Review  1 (1964): 18.
 DeLong, David G. "A Tower Expressive of Unique Interiors." AIA Journal  71 (Jul. 1982): 78–83.
 Dillon David. "The Inn at Price Tower." Architectural Record  (Jul. 2003): 118–125.
 "Een Amerikaans architectenbureau." Bouw [Rotterdam] 11 (4 Aug. 1956): 670–673.
 "18-Story Tower Cantilever Structure of Concrete and Glass: Dramatic Frank Lloyd Wright Design." Building Materials Digest  14 (Dec. 1954): 425.
 "Frank Lloyd Wright: After 36 Years His Tower is Completed." Architectural Forum  104 (Feb. 1956): 106–113.
 "Frank Lloyd Wright's Concrete and Copper Skyscraper on the Prairie for H.C. Price Co." Architectural Forum  98 (May 1953): 98–105.
 "Frank Lloyd Wright; la 'Price Tower'." Casabella Continutà  211 (Jun.-Jul. 1956): 8-21.
 "Frank Lloyd Wright's Price Tower Wins AIA Twenty-five Year Award." Architectural Record  171 (Apr. 1983): 83.
 Gordon, Joanne. "The Skyscraper that Shocks Oklahoma Town." Kansas City Star  (11 Mar. 1956).
 "Gratte-ciel à Bartlesville, cite de 25,000 habitants, U.S.A." Architecture d'aujourd'hui  27 (Oct. 1956): 23.
 "H.C. Price Company." The Tie-In Quarterly  (Mar. 1953): 1–3, 28.
 "H.C. Price Company Had Humble Beginning." The Bartlesville Examiner  (9 Feb. 1956).
 "The H.C. Price Tower." Architectural Record  119 (Feb. 1956): 153–160.
 Hosokawa, Bill. "Price's Tower of Independence." The Denver Post  (Mar. 1956).
 Kellogg, Craig. "Matter of Design: Full Time Job." Interior Design  (Jul. 2003): 174–175.
 Klein, John. "Inside and Out, The Wright Stuff." Tulsa World  (5 Jun. 1990).
 "The Lighting in Frank Lloyd Wright's Ultra Modern Tower." Lighting (Dec. 1956): 26–27.
 Lucas, Suzette. Frank Lloyd Wright Quarterly Vol. 12 no. 1 (Winter 2001): 28.
 Nash, Eric P. "Travel Advisory: Rooms with a View, By Frank Lloyd Wright." New York Times  (16 Mar. 2003).
 "Prairie Skyscraper." Time 61 (25 May 1953): 43.
 "Price Tower Completion Story." The Tie-In Quarterly  13 (Winter 1956): 2–5.
 "The Price Tower is Wright's." Southern Living  (Dec. 1990).
 "Price Tower Will Be Built in Bartlesville." Construction News Monthly  (10 Jun. 1953): 117–118.
 Saarinen, Aline. "Preserving Wright's Architecture." New York Times  (19 April 1959): X-17.
 Schmertz, Mildred F. "Inn at Price Tower: An Oklahoma Hotel Finds a Home in Frank Lloyd Wright's 1950s High-Rise." Architectural Digest (June 2003): 72, 74, 76, 77.
 Thomas, Mark. "F.L.W. Again." Architectural Design  (Dec. 1953): 347–349.
 "Tower to Provide Office, Living Space." Engineering News-Record  (4 Jun. 1953): 23.
 "Watch on Wright's Landmarks." Architectural Record 126 (Sep. 1959): 9.
 Williams, Rainey Heard. "Interior is Divided Into Quadrants." Christian Science Monitor  (30 Mar. 1956).
 "Wright Completes Skyscraper." Progressive Architecture  37 (Feb. 1956): 87–90.
 Wright, Frank Lloyd. "Frank Lloyd Wright." Architectural Forum  58 (Jan. 1938): special issue, 1–102.
 Wright, Frank Lloyd. "Frank Lloyd Wright." Architectural Forum  88 (Jan. 1948): 54, 65–156.

Books
 Alofsin, Anthony, ed. Prairie Skyscraper: Frank Lloyd Wright's Price Tower. New York: Rizzoli, 2005.
 Blake, Peter. The Master Builders. New York: W.W. Norton, 1960. 403–406.
 Drexler, Arthur, ed. The Drawings of Frank Lloyd Wright. New York: Horizon Press for the Museum of Modern Art, 1962.
 Eaton, Timothy A, ed. Frank Lloyd Wright: The Seat of Genius, Chairs 1895-1955. West Palm Beach: Eaton Fine Art, Inc, 1997.
 Futagawa, Yukio, and Martin Pawley, eds. Frank Lloyd Wright Public Buildings. New York: Simon and Schuster, 1970.
 Futagawa, Yukio, and Bruce Brooks Pfeiffer, eds. Frank Lloyd Wright and His Renderings, 1887-1959. Tokyo: A.D.A. Edita, 1984.
 Gill, Brendan. Many Masks: A Life of Frank Lloyd Wright. New York: G.P. Putnam's Sons, 1987.
 Hanks, David A. The Decorative Designs of Frank Lloyd Wright. New York: E.P. Dutton, 1979.
 Hanks, David A. Frank Lloyd Wright: Preserving an Architectural Heritage.  New York: E.P. Dutton, 1989.
 Heinz, Thomas A. Frank Lloyd Wright Interiors and Furniture. London: Academy Editions, 1994.
 Hildebrand, Grant. The Wright Space: Pattern and Meaning in Frank Lloyd Wright's Houses. Seattle: University of Washington Press, 1991.
 Hitchcock, Henry-Russell. In the Natural of Materials. New York: Sloan and Pearce Duell, 1942.
 Hoffmann, Donald. Frank Lloyd Wright, Louis Sullivan, and the Skyscraper. New York: Dover, 1998.
 Izzo, Alberto, and Caroline Gubitossi, eds. Designs 1887-1959. Florence: Centro-Di, 1976.
 Kaufmann Jr. Edgar. An American Architecture. New York: Horizon Press, 1955.
 Laseau, Paul, and James Tice. Frank Lloyd Wright: Between Principle and Form. New York: Van Nostrand Reinhold, 1992.
 McCarter, Robert. Frank Lloyd Wright. London: Phaidon Press, 1997.
 McCarter, Robert, ed. Frank Lloyd Wright: A Primer on Architectural Principles. New York: Princeton Architectural Press, 1991.
 Meehan, Patrick J., ed. The Master Architect: Conversations with Frank Lloyd Wright. New York: John Wiley and Sons, 1984.
 Meehan, Patrick J., ed. Truth Against the World: Frank Lloyd Wright Speaks for an Organic Architecture. New York: John Wiley & Sons, 1987.
 Patterson, Terry L. Frank Lloyd Wright and the Meaning of Materials. New York: Van Nostrand Reinhold, 1994.
 Pfeiffer, Bruce Brooks, ed. Frank Lloyd Wright Collected Writings, vol. 2, 1930-1932. NYC: Rizzoli, 1992.
 Pfeiffer, Bruce Brooks, ed. Frank Lloyd Wright: Letters to Clients. Fresno: The Press at California State University, 1986.
 Riley, Terence, and Peter Reed, eds. Frank Lloyd Wright: Architect. New York: Museum of Modern Art, 1994.
 Samona, Giuseppe, et al. Drawings for a Living Architecture. New York: Horizon Press, 1959.
 Scully Jr. Vincent. Frank Lloyd Wright. New York: George Braziller, 1960.
 Storrer, William A. The Frank Lloyd Wright Companion. Chicago: University of Chicago Press, 1993 (S.355). 
 Thompson, Iain. Frank Lloyd Wright: A Visual Encyclopedia. London: PRC Publishing, 1999.
 Twombly, Robert C. Frank Lloyd Wright: His Life and Architecture. New York: John Wiley and Sons, 1979.
 Wright, Frank Lloyd. An Autobiography. New York: Horizon, 1943.
 Wright, Frank Lloyd. The Living City. New York: Horizon Press, 1958.
 Wright, Frank Lloyd. The Story of the Tower: The Tree That Escaped the Crowded Forest. New York: Horizon Press, 1956.
 Wright, Frank Lloyd, and Bruce Brooks Pfeiffer. Frank Lloyd Wright in the Realm of Ideas. Carbondale: Southern Illinois University Press, 1988.
 Wright, Frank Lloyd, and Frank Lloyd Wright Foundation. The Designs of Frank Lloyd Wright, Owned by the Frank Lloyd Wright Foundation. Flagstaff: Frank Lloyd Wright Foundation, 1991.
 Wright, Frank Lloyd, and Frank Lloyd Wright Foundation. Schumacher Drawings, Textile Patterns. Flagstaff: Frank Lloyd Wright Foundation, 1985.
 Wright, Olgivanna Lloyd. Selected Drawings Portfolio Vol. I. Tokyo: A.D.A. Edita Tokyo Co. Ltd., 1977.
 Wright, Olgivanna Lloyd. Selected Drawings Portfolio Vol. II. Tokyo: A.D.A. Edita Tokyo Co. Ltd., 1979.
 Wright, Olgivanna Lloyd. Selected Drawings Portfolio III. Tokyo A.D.A. Edita Tokyo Co. Ltd., 1982.

External links

 Price Tower Arts Center
 TravelOK.com: Price Tower Arts Center info — travel and tourism website for the State of Oklahoma.
 Chicago Architecture Foundation Opens Price Tower Exhibit dBNews Chicago, Wednesday, January 10, 2007

Frank Lloyd Wright buildings
Bartlesville, Oklahoma
Art museums and galleries in Oklahoma
Hotels in Oklahoma
Museums in Washington County, Oklahoma
Residential skyscrapers in Oklahoma
Office buildings completed in 1956
National Historic Landmarks in Oklahoma
Commercial buildings on the National Register of Historic Places in Oklahoma

Modernist architecture in Oklahoma
National Register of Historic Places in Washington County, Oklahoma